Younes Khattabi (born 28 March 1984) is a Moroccan rugby league footballer who plays as a  or  for US Entraigues XIII in the Elite Two Championship. He previously played for SO Avignon and the Catalans Dragons in the Super League. He is notable for scoring the first try for the Catalans Dragons in the 2007 Challenge Cup Final against St. Helens, thus becoming the first Muslim to score a try at Wembley Stadium.

Background
Khattabi was born in Rabat, Morocco.

International career
Khattabi represented Morocco in a 2009 RLEF Euro Med Challenge match against Catalonia. He scored a try in the 29–6 win.

Khattabi represented France in the 2013 Rugby League World Cup.

References

External links
Super League profile

1984 births
Living people
AS Carcassonne players
Catalans Dragons players
France national rugby league team players
French sportspeople of Moroccan descent
French rugby league players
Morocco national rugby league team players
RC Carpentras XIII players
Rugby league centres
Rugby league wingers
Sporting Olympique Avignon players
Sportspeople from Rabat
US Entraigues XIII players
Sportspeople from Vaucluse